The 2016–17 Mauritian Premier League season is the 37th season of top-flight football in Mauritius. The season started on 22 October 2016 and concluded on 18 June 2017.

Standings

References

Mauritian Premier League seasons
Mauritius
Prem
Prem